Kilmaley is a Gaelic Athletic Association (GAA) club in County Clare, Ireland

Major honours
 Clare Senior Hurling Championship (2): 1985, 2004
 Munster Intermediate Club Hurling Championship Runners-Up: 2017
 Clare Intermediate Hurling Championship (2): 1980, 2017
 Clare Junior A Hurling Championship (3): 1963, 2001, 2006
 Clare Hurling League Div. 1 (Clare Cup) (?): 2001, 2019, 2022
 Clare Under-21 A Hurling Championship (3): 1975, 2015, 2019

Notable players
 Conor Clancy
 Colin Lynch
 Alan Markham
 Diarmuid McMahon

References

External sources

Gaelic games clubs in County Clare
Hurling clubs in County Clare